In Sufism, dhawq (tasting) is direct, first-hand experience. It refers, principally, to the Gnosis of God which is achieved experientially, as a result of rigorous empiric spiritual wayfaring. It plays an important role in the epistemology of Al-Ghazzali, and is often expressed, to some extent, in teleological statements scattered throughout his works.

References

Sufism